Caresana may refer to:

Cristofaro Caresana (ca. 1640-1709), Italian baroque composer
Caresana, Piedmont, a municipality in Italy
San Dorligo della Valle or Caresana, a village in the Province of Trieste